Westcoast Gangsta Shit is a collaborative studio album by American West Coast hip hop recording artists Daz Dillinger and WC. It was released on June 19, 2013 via Dilly Recordz and Bigg Swang Recordz. Production was handled by Rob Tee, Broadway, DJ 2High, Amplified, Beanz N Kornbread, Dae One, David Gold, DJ Battlecat, Kj Conteh, Kuddie Fresh, TJofthewest, The Arsonists, Touch Tone and Trippy Keez. It features guest appearances from Snoop Dogg and Butch Cassidy.

Background
On April 15, 2013, Daz Dillinger and WC announced that they would be releasing a collaborative album titled West Coast Gangsta Shit on July 2, 2013. The first single from the album "Late Nite" was released on May 21, 2013. The second single from the album "Wha'cha Gon Do" was released on May 31, 2013. The album was later released two weeks early on June 19, 2013. On August 2, 2013, the music video was released for "Don’t Call It A Comeback". On August 22, 2013, the music video was released for "Stay Out The Way" featuring Snoop Dogg.

Track listing

Sample credits
Track 9 contains elements from "Why You Treat Me So Bad" written by Denzil Foster, Thomas Derrick McElroy and Jay A. King

Personnel

Delmar "Daz Dillinger" Arnaud – main artist, executive producer
William "WC" Calhoun, Jr. – main artist, executive producer
Calvin "Snoop Dogg" Broadus – featured artist (track 2)
Danny "Butch Cassidy" Means – featured artist (track 13)
Fiji – background vocals (track 10)
James Broadway – scratches (tracks: 1, 9, 11, 13), producer (tracks: 1, 8)
Lamar "DJ Crazy Toones" Calhoun – scratching (track 3)
Jesus – bass (tracks: 11, 13)
Carlos "Los" McSwain – drums (tracks: 11, 13)
Masa Ash – keyboards (tracks: 11, 13)
Stretch Keys – keyboards (track 12)
Tony "Touch Tone" Issacs – producer (track 1)
Rob Tee – producer (tracks: 1, 8, 12), engineering, mixing
The Arsonists – producer (track 2)
Karrie "Kuddie Fresh" Carroll – producer (track 3)
Donald Johnson, Jr. – producer (track 4)
Kenneth Roy – producer (track 4)
Kadjaly "Kj" Conteh – producer (track 5), mixing
David Gold – producer (track 6)
Dameon "Dae One" Garrett – producer (track 6)
Kevin "DJ Battlecat" Gilliam – producer (track 7)
TJofthewest – producer (track 8)
C. "Trippy Keez" Varnado – producer (track 9), mixing
Amplified – producer (track 10)
E. "DJ 2High" Daniels – producer (tracks: 11, 13)
Travis "Shaggy" Marshall – mixing
ZBoy Fro – assistant engineering
Farid "Fredwreck" Nassar – mastering

References

2013 albums
WC (rapper) albums
Collaborative albums
Daz Dillinger albums
Gangsta rap albums by American artists